Victoria Rowland is an Australian actress, having started out working behind the cameras as a production assistant and wardrobe stylist she remains best known for playing Margaret "Spike" Marsh in the television drama Prisoner during its final months in 1986. She also had a role in the TV movie Economy Class.

Filmography

External links
 

Australian soap opera actresses
Living people
Year of birth missing (living people)
20th-century Australian actresses